Larkburger is an American restaurant chain that makes its food from "all-natural ingredients". It first opened in Edwards, Colorado, in 2006. Many of the restaurant's ingredients are made on-site. The restaurant is known for using wooden trays instead of plastic ones, wrapping burgers in brown paper, and placing side dishes inside cardboard boxes. This is all done to make the restaurant as organic and as eco-friendly as possible. The chain currently has three locations, with two currently open.

As of January 29, 2019, Larkburger announced a rebranding to Lark Spot, and the closure of 6 locations: Downtown Denver, Washington Park, University Hills, and Broomfield, Colorado locations as well as both of their Kansas City restaurants.

References

Restaurant chains
Restaurant chains in the United States
2006 establishments in Colorado
Restaurants established in 2006
Companies based in Colorado